Sand Hills, New Jersey may refer to:

Sand Hills, Edison and Woodbridge, New Jersey
Sand Hills, South Brunswick, New Jersey